Apistogramma trifasciata, also known as three-striped dwarf cichlid is a species of fish from the ‘Arroyo Chagalalina’ in Paraguay extending towards the rio Guaporé drainage in the southern Amazon basin though the connected rio Paraguay watershed in Brazil and Paraguay and on as far as the middle Paraná  basin in Argentina.

References

trifasciata
Fish of Paraguay
Fish described in 1903
Fish of Brazil
Fish of Argentina